John Chapple may refer to:

 John Chapple (British Army officer) (1931–2022), governor of Gibraltar
 John Henry George Chapple, British admiral and courtier
 John B. Chapple, political candidate in Wisconsin.
 John C. Chapple, American newspaper editor and politician
 John Starling Chapple, English stonemason and architect
 John Boyle Chapple, Canadian politician